The 2001–02 NBA season was the Warriors' 56th season in the National Basketball Association, and 40th in the San Francisco Bay Area. This season saw the Warriors draft Jason Richardson from Michigan State with the fifth overall pick in the 2001 NBA draft, while drafting Troy Murphy from the University of Notre Dame with the 14th overall pick, and Gilbert Arenas from the University of Arizona with the 31st overall pick in the second round. The acquisitions of Richardson, Murphy and Arenas sought to help with the Warriors' struggles the past seasons with a 5–3 start to the season. Instead, their struggles continued as they lost 12 of their next 15 games. Head coach Dave Cowens was fired after an 8–15 start, and was replaced with Brian Winters. At midseason, second-year center Marc Jackson was traded to the Minnesota Timberwolves in exchange for Dean Garrett. The Warriors suffered a ten-game losing streak in March and finished last place in the Pacific Division with a 21–61 record, which was tied with the Chicago Bulls for the worst league record.

Despite their continuing struggles, Antawn Jamison led the team in scoring with 19.7 points per game, while Richardson averaged 14.4 points per game, and was named to the NBA All-Rookie First Team. Richardson also won the Slam Dunk Contest, and was invited to play in the Rookie Game during the All-Star Weekend in Philadelphia, where he won the MVP award, and also finished in third place in Rookie of the Year voting.

Following the season, Larry Hughes signed as a free agent with the Washington Wizards, while Winters was fired as head coach, Garrett was released to free agency and Mookie Blaylock retired.

Offseason

Draft picks

Roster

Regular season

Season standings

z - clinched division title
y - clinched division title
x - clinched playoff spot

Record vs. opponents

Game log

Player statistics

Season

Awards and records

Transactions

References

See also
 2001-02 NBA season

Golden State Warriors seasons
Golden
Golden
Golden State